"Mental Cases" is one of Wilfred Owen's more graphic poems. It describes war-torn men suffering from post-traumatic stress disorder, otherwise known as shell shock. Owen based the poem on his experience of Craiglockhart Military Hospital, near Edinburgh, where he was invalided in the summer of 1917 with neurasthenia, and became the patient of Dr A.J. Brock. Using imagery of death and violence, Owen presents a chilling portrait of men haunted by their experiences.

Short analysis 

The poem adopts a questioning tone initially, with the speaker asking “Who are these? Why sit they here in twilight?” Owen uses this to present the men almost as strange carnival exhibits to be inspected or wondered at, emphasised by the base pronoun "these". They are depicted as grizzly, fascinating creatures, which seem "hellish" to the speaker.

The second stanza goes on to depict memory as a cruel monster which tortures their minds, forcing them to relive the "Carnage incomparable" they witnessed. Owen's chilling contrast between "Treading blood" and "lungs that had loved laughter" echoes a regular theme in his works, that the men who gave themselves for the war had once been amiable and friendly people before the dead "ravished" their minds.

The third stanza describes how those who survived the war live now with shell shock, in that scenes from the battlefield insert themselves into everyday life; sunlight is a "blood-smear" on a window, then night falls "blood-black" - they cannot escape the sight of blood. The macabre tone of the poem is added to by the image of hallucinations of "set-smiling corpses", describing the "hilarious, hideous" faces of the patients as they remember. Typically for Owen, he concludes with blame; it was "us who smote them", and "dealt them war and madness"; this echoes the ending of Owen's most famous poem, Dulce et Decorum Est.

References 

http://www.slideshare.net/rgarofano/mental-cases-analysis

British poetry
World War I poems
1918 poems
Poetry by Wilfred Owen
Post-traumatic stress disorder